Spitz is a German surname. Notable people with the surname include:

 Armand Spitz (1904–1971), American planetarium designer
 Bob Spitz, American journalist and author
 Carl Spitz (1894–1976), Hollywood dog trainer
 Chantal Spitz (born 1954), French Polynesian writer
 Dan Spitz (born 1963), American guitarist
 Dave Spitz (born 1955), American bassist
 Donald Spitz, American anti-abortion activist
 Elisa Spitz, American figure skater
 Fannie S. Spitz (1873–1943), American inventor
 Gerald J. Spitz, American politician
 Hanneliese Spitz (born 1941), Austrian sprint canoeist
 Herman H. Spitz, American psychologist
 Illés Spitz
 Isaac Spitz (1764–1842), Bohemian writer
 Jacques Spitz (1896–1963), French writer
 Jason Spitz (born 1982), American football player
 Leó Szilárd, born Leó Spitz, Hungarian scientist
 Lewis Spitz (born 1939), South African paediatric surgeon
 Malte Spitz (born 1984), German politician
 Marc Spitz (1969–2017), American writer and music journalist
 Mark Spitz (born 1950), American swimmer
 René Spitz (1887–1974), Austrian-American psychoanalyst
 Sabine Spitz (born 1971), German cross-country cyclist
 Sophie Spitz (1910–1956), American pathologist
 Tibor Spitz, American artist and Holocaust survivor
 Vivien Spitz, American journalist
 Werner Spitz, German Forensic Pathologist
 Yom-Tob Spitz (1797–1874), Bohemian writer

Fictional characters
 Adam Spitz and Sharon Spitz, two characters in the television series Braceface

German-language surnames
Jewish surnames